is a Buddhist temple in the Eigenji-Takano neighborhood of the city of Higashiōmi, Shiga Prefecture, Japan. It is the head temple of one of the 14 autonomous branches of the Rinzai school of Japanese Zen

History
Eigen-ji was founded in 1361 by  the famous poet and roshi Jakushitsu Genkō under the sponsorship of the shugo of Ōmi Province, Sasaki Ujinori. At its head, the temple had over 2000 priests and 56 chapels on the mountainside. During the Onin War, many priests from the Kyoto Gozan temple sought sanctuary at Eigen-ji; however, the temple burned down in 1492 and again in 1563 and fell into decline afterwards. According to a tradition in Inabe city in Mie Prefecture, a priest from Eigen-ji escaped over the Suzuka Mountains into Ise Province bearing the temple's treasures when the temple was destroyed by Takigawa Kazumasa on orders of Oda Nobunaga in 1570; however, there are no records of such an event at Eigen-ji itself.

During the Edo period, the temple was revived by an abbot named Isshi Bunshu from Myōshin-ji in Kyoto, under the sponsorship of Emperor Go-Mizunoo, his consort Tofukumon-in and Hikone Domain. IN 1873, he joined the Tofuku-ji subject of the Rinzai school, but became an independent branch in 1880.

Present day
Today it is the head temple of the Eigen-ji branch of Rinzai Zen and governs more than 120 temples and one monastery. The temple is a noted spot for hanami in spring, with a variant of the sakura known as the "Eigenji-zakura",  and for viewing of maple leaves in the autumn.

Gallery

See also 
 For an explanation of terms concerning Japanese Buddhism, Japanese Buddhist art, and Japanese Buddhist temple architecture, see the Glossary of Japanese Buddhism.
  The 100 Views of Nature in Kansai

References

External links

Shiga-Biwako Tourist Information

Notes

Buddhist temples in Shiga Prefecture
Eigen-ji temples
 
Higashiōmi